Charles Freeman Erb Jr. (December 8, 1902 – March 7, 1952) was an American football player and coach. He was the head coach at the University of Nevada, Reno (1924), the University of Idaho (1926–1928) and Humboldt State College (1935–1937), compiling a career college football record of 28–19–7.

Playing career
At Manual Arts High School in Los Angeles, Erb was the California player of the year during the 1917 season as an end.

Erb played college football as a quarterback at California from 1920 through 1922, on the undefeated "Wonder Teams" led by head coach Andy Smith. The 1920 team won the Rose Bowl and the 1921 team tied in the 1922 Rose Bowl. The undefeated 1922 and 1923 teams did not play in the postseason.

Coaching career
In 1924, he coached at Nevada, where he compiled a 3–4–1 record. He was hired at Idaho in May 1926 as head coach and director of athletics, where he compiled a 10–9–5 record in three seasons. His 1927 team contended for the title in the Pacific Coast Conference and were co-champions, but the 1928 team had a more difficult season, after which he submitted his resignation.

After Idaho, his career record stood at 13–13–6 in four seasons. From 1935 to 1937 he coached in California at Humboldt State, where he compiled a 15–6–1 record.

Personal life
His son, Charles "Boots" Erb (1925–2013), also played quarterback at California, under head coach Pappy Waldorf in the late 1940s. Boots saw action in the 1949 and 1950 Rose Bowls. The Erbs were the first father & son to quarterback in the Rose Bowl.

Erb died of a heart attack, suffered in his sleep during the night of March 7, 1952, at his home in North Hollywood, Los Angeles.

Head coaching record

References

External links
 

1902 births
1952 deaths
American football quarterbacks
California Golden Bears football players
Humboldt State Lumberjacks football coaches
Idaho Vandals athletic directors
Idaho Vandals football coaches
Nevada Wolf Pack football coaches